S.R. Fatepuria College, or Sewnarayan Rameswar Fatepuria College established in 1965, is a general degree college situated at Beldanga in Murshidabad district. It offers undergraduate courses in arts, commerce and sciences. It is affiliated with the University of Kalyani. It also offers post graduate degrees in distance mode under Kalyani University.

Departments

Science

Chemistry
Physics
Mathematics
Environmental Science

Arts and Commerce

Bengali
English
Sanskrit
Arabic
History
Geography
Political Science
Philosophy
Physical Education
Education
Economics
Commerce

Accreditation
The college is recognized by the University Grants Commission (UGC).

See also

References

External links
S.R. Fatepuria College
University of Kalyani
University Grants Commission
National Assessment and Accreditation Council

Colleges affiliated to University of Kalyani
Educational institutions established in 1965
Universities and colleges in Murshidabad district
1965 establishments in West Bengal